Natale Rosario Scalero (24 December 1870 in Moncalieri - 25 December 1954 in Montestrutto) was an Italian violinist, music teacher and composer.

Life and career
By the age of six, Scalero was under the tutelage of Pietro Bertazzi, a violinist, musical instrument maker and instructor at the Conservatorio St. Cecilia in Rome. In 1881, Scalero entered the Liceo Musicale di Torino under Luigi Avalle. At the age of 15, Scalero came under the tutelage of César Thomson. Scalero appears to have returned to his home at Moncalieri for a time for health reasons, before returning to Torino (Turin) to study with Camillo Sivori through 1889, appearing during this time with the Sivori Quartet.

In 1891, Scalero made his debut as a recitalist in Leipzig, following which he performed in Milan, Rome, London, and throughout Europe to critical acclaim. In 1895, Scalero went to London to study and assist violinist August Wilhelmj (concert master of the world premiere of Wagner's Ring of the Nibelungs in Bayreuth). In 1900 he left London for Vienna, where he became a composition student of Eusebius Mandyczewski.

1907 returned Scalero to Rome. Here he joined in 1913 the Società del Quartetto and became its musical director and first violinist. In 1919, he succeeded Ernest Bloch as a composition teacher at the Mannes School of Music in New York. After 1927, he taught at the famous Curtis Institute of Music in Philadelphia, while apparently keeping a residence in Gressoney. Among his most successful students at Curtis were composers Samuel Barber, Nino Rota, Gian Carlo Menotti and George Walker. During that time he also taught composition to Marc Blitzstein. In 1946 he returned to Montestrutto, near Ivrea, where he died in 1954.

Works 
A Suite for String Quartet and String Orchestra 
La Divina Foresta, symphonic poem for large orchestra 
Violin Sonata (Op.12, D minor, published 1910)

Pupils

References

External links
 Rosario Scalero, Retrieved 25 August 2010
 Music Is My Faith - An Autobiography. David Mannes,

External links

1870 births
1954 deaths
20th-century classical composers
20th-century Italian composers
20th-century Italian male musicians
Curtis Institute of Music faculty
Italian classical composers
Italian male classical composers
Italian classical violinists
Male classical violinists
People from Moncalieri